is a city located in Wakayama Prefecture, Japan. , the city had an estimated population of 54,138 in 23906 households and a population density of 1400 persons per km².

Geography
Iwade is located on the northern border of Wakayama Prefecture with Osaka Prefecture. The Kinokawa River flows along the southern border of Iwade.

Neighboring municipalities
Wakayama Prefecture
Wakayama (city)
Kinokawa
Osaka Prefecture
Sennan
Hannan

Climate
Iwade has a Humid subtropical climate (Köppen Cfa) characterized by warm summers and cool winters with light to no snowfall.  The average annual temperature in Iwade is 15.1 °C. The average annual rainfall is 1713 mm with September as the wettest month. The temperatures are highest on average in August, at around 26.5 °C, and lowest in January, at around 4.4 °C.

Demographics
Per Japanese census data, the population of Iwade has increased rapidly over the past 60 years.

History
The area of the modern city of Iwade was within ancient Kii Province. Negoroji temple was founded in the 12th century. After the Meiji restoration, the area became part of Naga District, Wakayama, and the village of Iwade was established with the creation of the modern municipalities system on April 1, 1889. Iwade was promoted to town status on August 1, 1908. On September 30, 1956 Yade annexed the neighboring villages of Yamazaki, Negoro and Kamiiwade. The five towns in Naga District other than Iwade merged on November 7, 2005 to become the city of Kinokawa. However, as the town had a population of more than 50,000 people as of the 2005 census Iwade fulfilled the requirements to gain city status by both the ordinance of Wakayama Prefecture and Local Government Law.  At the request of residents, Iwade decided to gain city status alone, which was attained on April 1, 2006

Government
Iwade has a mayor-council form of government with a directly elected mayor and a unicameral city council of 14 members. Iwade contributes two members to the Wakayama Prefectural Assembly. In terms of national politics, the city is part of Wakayama 2nd district of the lower house of the Diet of Japan.

Economy
Iwade has a mixed economy of light manufacturing, logistics, and agriculture. Due to its proximity to the city of Wakayama, it is increasingly becoming a bedroom community.

Education
Iwade has six public elementary schools and two public middle schools operated by the city government and one public high school operated by the Wakayama Prefectural Department of Education.

Transportation

Railway
 JR West – Wakayama Line
 -

Highway
  Keinawa Expressway

Local attractions
 Negoroji temple
 Wakayama Prefecture Botanical Park
 Nishi Kokubun pagoda site

References

External links

  

Cities in Wakayama Prefecture
Iwade, Wakayama